Dalli-Rajhara is a town and a municipality in Balod district in the state of Chhattisgarh, India.  Dalli Rajhara is home of iron ore captive mines for Bhilai Steel Plant, the largest integrated steel plant in India. Dalli mines deposit was discovered by Pramatha Nath Bose, the first Indian graded officer of the Geological Survey of India around 1900.

Geography

Demographics 

As of the census of India 2011 population of Dalli Rajhara is 44,363. It has just 11,018 Households including House-less which shows declining trend of population.

As of the 2001 India census, Dalli-Rajhara had a population of 50,615.  Males constitute 52% of the population and females 48%. Dalli-Rajhara has an average literacy rate of 68%, higher than the national average of 59.5%. Male literacy is 77% and, female literacy is 58%. In Dalli-Rajhara, 14% of the population is under 6 years of age.

Mining township

Dalli-Rajhara is the twin mine and part of the Rajhara group of mines.  These are captive iron ore mines for Bhilai Steel Plant (BSP)a SAIL enterprise.  Iron ores mined from the area are of the hematite and magnetite variety.  The other mines in the neighbourhood produce dolomite, lime and other raw materials which go into steel production.

Dalli-Rajhara is about 83 km south of Durg and comes under the south-eastern section of the Indian Railways. While both Dalli and Rajhara have mines, the residential area is predominantly in Rajhara.
Dalli-Rajhara is a self-sufficient township with BSP having set up hospitals and a considerable number of educational institutes.

Dalli-Rajhara rose to prominence as a result of the labour rights movement in the 1970s.

The mines are open cast mines and the poignant view as one enters the township at dusk is that of thousands of glittering lights on the hills.

The expert appraisal committee (EAC) of the ministry had met during the last three days to clear a shelf of stranded projects entailing an investment of nearly Rs 80,000 crore. The EAC has cleared 12 of these projects. The committee is expected to meet shortly again to take a call on the remaining projects. Among those cleared on Saturday are SAIL's proposed 1 million tonne per annum pellet plant along with upstream slime beneficiation facilities at its Dalli-Rajhara iron ore mine in Chhattisgarh.

Transport
This area is connected via rail and road with its district balod.  It is well connected by bus to the Durg and Bastar region.  The road is in quite good shape.  Only one passenger train runs between Dalli and Durg. Much development is due on the rail connectivity front.  There is an ongoing rail link with Jagdalpur.

Extending rail transport
Union Railway Budget of 2012–13 has proposed new links to existing Durg-Dalli Rajhara railway line.

 Ongoing project of Dalli Rajhara–Rowghat–Jagdalpur. (Phase 1 first stretch Dalli Rajhara–Keoti work has been started).
  Extension of trains: 78816/78815 Dalli Rajhara–Durg DEMU to Raipur.
  New line surveys for extending proposed Dalli Rajhara railway line by constructing it up to Balod–Dhamtari.
  New line surveys for Dalli Rajhara–Chandrapur (Maharashtra) via Khadgaon, BharriTola and Manpur.
  New line surveys for linking Bhanupratappur with Dalli Rajhara–Rowghat under construction rail line and connecting it with Jagdalpur.

Culture
The majority of the population is dependent on BSP for their livelihood. Being a public sector company, BSP has attracted people across India from Bihar to Bengal to Kerala. The pace of life is slower than in the cities. Festivals ranging from Durgapuja to Chatt Puja to ONAM to Christmas are all celebrated.

In brief, the culture is quite cosmopolitan with a flavour of modesty in lifestyle. The cost of living is relatively low.

Among the employees of BSP, many religions are present in the community, as well as people from different parts of India. There are various clubs for social activities. Durga Puja of Camp 1 ground, Flower show organized by BSP in Saptgiri Park are regular events every year.

Sports
Sports such as football (soccer) for which rajahara Mines is famous in whole of India, cricket and athletics are quite popular in Dalli-Rajhara.  During the 1980s the annual Iron Ore All-India gold cup Football tournament (sponsored by BSP) was very popular.  Several top football clubs from all over India would compete in this tournament. Well-known soccer players like Zilani, Trinath Naidu, Appal Naidu, Shant Kumar, Rubi David, Prem Nair and their 2nd generation such as Prem Sharma, Tajjuddin, Krishna Naidu (Tittu), Ravikant & Shrikant Naidu who had excelled in football and makes Rajhara mines Football team Famous all around the country. Current Football team includes players named Anil, Deepak Mahato, Praveen Sharma, Nageshwar Rao, Dilip Thapa, Himanshu kola, Sanjay kunjam, Shivam Nayak, Bhalesh, Deshant, Siddharth, Gaurav kachlam and many other young talents. Under the same sponsorship, sports such as weight-lifting and athletics also had a good following.

Most young people leave the area after their Higher Secondary or bachelor's degree in search of jobs in various parts of India.

During the 2000s the annual Iron Ore All-India Cricket tournament (sponsored by RCA-BSP) was very popular. Several top cricket clubs from all over India would compete in this tournament.

Stadiums
 Pt. Jawahar Lal Nehru Football Stadium
 Rajhara Cricket Stadium, South Avenue Road
 Shaheed Sudama Football Stadium, Camp Area
 Vir Narayan Stadium, High School Sector
 Hospital Sector Ground, Hospital Sector

Places of interest
The Bordih dam is a beautiful picnic spot. The surrounding hills and forests are home to many species of wildlife. Dalli Rajhara is surrounded by seven beautiful hills. Rajhara is rich in green patches across the town. Rajhara Baba Mandir Saptagiri Park, Dev Pandum, Munda Pahad, Boirdeeh Dam, Mahamaya Mandir, Pandwan Dev, Danitola Dargah and Siyadevi are all places of interest.

Gallery

Notable people 
 Pramatha Nath Bose
 Shankar Guha Niyogi

References 

Cities and towns in Balod district
Mining communities in India